Fran Horowitz-Bonadies is an American businesswoman. She is the CEO of Abercrombie & Fitch Co., a position she has held since her appointment in February 2017 following the ouster of Mike Jeffries.

Early life and education
Horowitz attended high school in Armonk, New York. She received a liberal arts degree from Lafayette College in 1985 and an MBA from Fordham University in 1990.

Career
Horowitz began her career in buying positions at Bergdorf Goodman, Bonwit Teller, and Saks Fifth Avenue. She served for 9 months as President of Ann Taylor Loft and in various corporate roles at Express, Inc. She also worked at Bloomingdale's for 13 years in various merchandising roles.

Abercrombie & Fitch
Horowitz joined Abercrombie & Fitch in October 2014 as President of the Hollister brand. She served in this capacity for 13 months where she built upon marketing, merchandising and store operation changes put in motion years prior. She was promoted to president and Chief Merchandising Officer of Abercrombie & Fitch Co., a new corporate role, in December 2015. She served in this capacity for 13 months prior to being named CEO and member of the board of directors.  Her 2017 annual compensation was $10.3M, of which roughly two-thirds was awarded in company stock, nearly 3400 times an average (part-time) employee.

References

Year of birth missing (living people)
Living people
American women chief executives
American chief executives of fashion industry companies
Lafayette College alumni
Fordham University alumni
21st-century American women